is the 18th single by Japanese entertainer Miho Nakayama. Written by Gorō Matsui and Cindy, the single was released on March 21, 1990, by King Records.

Background and release
"Semi-sweet Magic" was used by Kyōwa Saitama Bank for their commercial featuring Nakayama.

"Semi-sweet Magic" peaked at No. 3 on Oricon's weekly singles chart and sold over 122,000 copies.

Track listing

Charts

References

External links

1990 singles
1990 songs
Japanese-language songs
Miho Nakayama songs
Songs with lyrics by Gorō Matsui
King Records (Japan) singles